The term free carrier has specific meanings in diverse fields, including:

 International commerce (see incoterms#Free Carrier)
 Semiconductor physics (see Free Carrier Concentration)